Ian Robert Wishart (born c. 1954) is a Canadian politician and member of the Legislative Assembly of Manitoba, representing the electoral district of Portage la Prairie as a member of the Progressive Conservative Party of Manitoba. He was first elected in the 2011 provincial election, and re-elected in 2016 and 2019.

On May 3, 2016 Wishart was appointed to the Executive Council of Manitoba as Minister of Education and Training. He was shuffled out of cabinet on August 1, 2018 and appointed the Legislative Assistant to the Minister of Education and Training, tasked with co-ordinating a thorough review of the kindergarten to Grade 12 education system in Manitoba.

Electoral record

References

External links
Ian Wishart

Living people
Progressive Conservative Party of Manitoba MLAs
Members of the Executive Council of Manitoba
21st-century Canadian politicians
Year of birth missing (living people)
Place of birth missing (living people)